Nine ships of the Royal Navy have been named HMS Alacrity:

 was an 18-gun  launched in 1806 and captured by the French in 1811.
 was a 10-gun  brig-sloop launched in 1818 and sold in 1835.
 was a wooden screw sloop launched in 1856 and sold in 1864.
 was the former civilian vessel Ethel, purchased in 1872 and sold in 1882.
 was a  third class cruiser, launched in 1885 and sold in 1913.
the original  third class cruiser  launched in 1885 was renamed HMS Alacrity in 1913 and sold in 1919.
 was a yacht and despatch vessel launched as Margarita in 1900, renamed Semiramis in 1910 and Mlada in 1913. She was requisitioned in 1918 and commissioned in 1919 as HMS Alacrity. She was paid off in 1922, sold in 1923 and broken up in 1936.
 was a Modified Black Swan-class sloop launched in 1944 and broken up in 1956.
 was a Type 21 frigate launched in 1974. She served in the Falklands War and was sold to Pakistan in 1994 and renamed Badr.

Battle honours
Ships named Alacrity have earned the following battle honours:
China, 1900
Korea, 1950−52
Falkland Islands, 1982

Royal Navy ship names